The 1951–52 season saw Rochdale compete for their 24th season in the Football League Third Division North.

Statistics
																												
								
								
								
								
								
								
								
								
								
								
								
								
								
								
								
								
								
								
								
								
								
								
								
								
								
								
								
								
								

|}

Final League Table

Competitions

Football League Third Division North

F.A. Cup

Lancashire Cup

References

Rochdale A.F.C. seasons
Rochdale